Cangde Grand Bridge is the world's fourth longest bridge. Finished in 2010, the bridge is a part of the Beijing–Shanghai High-Speed Railway and is the third longest bridge on the railway. The bridge has been designed with a view to withstanding earthquakes.

See also
 List of longest bridges in the world

References

Bridges in China
Railway bridges in China
High-speed rail in China